Búðardalur is a village situated on the Hvammsfjörður in the north-west of Iceland.

The village also lies at the north-eastern end of the Snæfellsnes peninsula and is part of the municipality of Dalabyggð. Búðardalur had about 270 inhabitants in 2014 and is a service center for the area, including the regional tourist information centre.  In the traditional system of counties of Iceland that existed until the late 1980s, it was part of Dalasýsla, a name that is still used for the region.

Overview
Búðardalur contains a supermarket and a petrol station, hair salons, a pub/restaurant, a coffee shop, a health-care centre, an off-licence, a garage and a craft shop; the information centre is in the same building as a cafe and a museum on the Vínland expeditions.

The village has a long history, dating from the time of the first settlements in Iceland. The name means "Camp Valley", or more etymologically straightforward "Boothdale"; it is where settlers had temporary camps when coming to the area. In 1899, Búðardalur was officially granted the right of commerce. An old house from this time still exists.

At a short distance from the village is Eiríksstaðir, the homestead of Erik the Red, who was the first European to discover Greenland and whose son Leif Erikson, born at Eiríksstaðir, was the first European to discover America ahead of Columbus.

Climate
Dependin on the isotherm used ( or ), Búðardalur has either the rare dry-summer subarctic climate (Köppen: Dsc) or the extremely rare cold-summer mediterranean climate (Köppen: Csc) with cold but not severe winters and cool summers.

References

Populated places in Western Region (Iceland)